Gustavo Adolfo Restrepo Baena (born 27 July 1982 in El Cairo Valle) is a Colombian race walker.

Achievements

References

1982 births
Living people
Colombian male racewalkers
Athletes (track and field) at the 2007 Pan American Games
Pan American Games medalists in athletics (track and field)
Pan American Games bronze medalists for Colombia
Central American and Caribbean Games bronze medalists for Colombia
Competitors at the 2010 Central American and Caribbean Games
Central American and Caribbean Games medalists in athletics
Medalists at the 2007 Pan American Games
Sportspeople from Valle del Cauca Department
21st-century Colombian people